Mawlaik District (formerly Upper Chindwin District) is a district in central Sagaing Division of Burma (Myanmar).  Its administrative center is the town of Mawlaik.

Townships

Mawlaik district consists of 2 townships.
 Mawlaik Township
 Paungbyin Township

Characteristics
The district consists of just two townships, Mawlaik and Paungbyin.  In addition to Mawlaik, the major towns are Kindat (Kintat), Kaunggwe, Khawe, Inntaw, Lawtha, Ontha (Ohnthar), Pantha, Paungbyin (Phaung Pyin or Phonpin), Sittaung, Tatkon, and Yuwa.  Major transportation is along the Chindwin River.  In 2006 the Mawlaik-Kalewa Road was completed.

Borders
Mawlaik District is bordered by:
 Hkamti District to the north,
 Tamu District  to the west,
 Kale (Kalemyo) District to the south, and
 Shwebo District and Katha District to the east.

Notes

External links
 "Mawlaik District, Burma" SatelliteViews.net
 

 
Districts of Myanmar